Below is a List of current NRL Women's team squads. There are 6 teams that compete in the NRL Women's Premiership, increasing in 2021 from the 4 teams that played in the first three seasons. 

Statistics for the past seasons drawn from the Rugby League Project.

Brisbane Broncos 
The team is coached by Kelvin Wright. 
Jersey numbers in the table reflect those assigned for Round 5. 
Table last updated on 19 Sep 2022 (after Round 5).

Notes:
 Amy Turner was selected in the 2007 Australian Jillaroos team that played two Test Matches against New Zealand Māori women's rugby league team, however, the lists of players that took the field in those matches are yet to be confirmed by the contributor to this page.
 Crystal Tamarua has played three matches for the Cook Islands and four matches for the Kiwi Ferns.
 In 2021, Sara Sautia played for Canterbury Bulldogs ( 8m 2t) played in Tarsha Gale Cup Under 19 matches in New South Wales and subsequently played for  Wests Panthers in the senior state competition in Queensland.
 Hannah Larsson, as captain, and Jada Ferguson played for the Queensland Under 19 team in June 2022. 

The Brisbane Broncos announced player signings in several instalments between late May and early August 2022.

Gold Coast Titans 
The team is coached by Karyn Murphy.  
Jersey numbers in the table reflect those assigned for Round 5. 
Table last updated on 19 Sep 2022 (after Round 5).

Notes:
 The following players participated in Queensland’s Under 19 club tournament in 2021: Destiny Brill (West Panthers  4m 2t), Jetaya Faifua (Burleigh Bears  4m 1t ), April Ngatupuna (Wests Panthers  4m 4t), Hailee-Jay Ormond-Maunsell (Burleigh Bears  4m 4t ), Jasmine Peters (Mackay  1m 2t), Tiana Raftstrand-Smith (Burleigh Bears  1m 2t)
 In 2021, Georgia Hale played in both Queensland and NSW state senior competitions for, respectively, the Tweed Head Seagulls ( 7m 1t) and North Sydney Bears ( 4m).

The Gold Coast Titans announced player signings in several instalments between late May and early August 2022.

Newcastle Knights 
The team is coached by Ron Griffiths. 
Jersey numbers in the table reflect those assigned for the Grand Final. 
Table last updated on 4 Oct 2022 (after the Grand Final).

Notes:
 Kyra Simon ( 6m) played for Newcastle in the 2021 Tarsha Gale Cup for Under 21s.
 Hannah Southwell suffered an ACL injury in the Round 1 match, ruling her out for the remainder of the season.
The Newcastle Knights announced player signings in several instalments between early May and early August 2022.

Parramatta Eels 
The team is coached by Dean Widders. 
Jersey numbers in the table reflect those assigned for the Grand Final. 
Table last updated on 4 Oct 2022 (after the Grand Final).

Notes:
In May 2021, Walker represented Victoria in the Rugby League Women's National Championships.
 Tess Staines played for Riverina and for NSW Country Origin in 2021. In 2019, Staines played for the Prime Minister's XIII.

The Parramatta Eels announced player signings in several instalments between mid May and mid July 2022.

St. George Illawarra Dragons 

The team is coached by Jamie Soward.  
Jersey numbers in the table reflect those assigned for the Semi-Finals. 
Table last updated on 29 Sep 2022 (after the Semi-Finals).

Notes:
 Emma Tonegato played in the New South Wales women's rugby league team in 2012 and 2013.
 In 2021, Teagan Berry ( 9m 11t), Keele Browne  8m 3t), and Chantel Tugaga ( 7m 2t) played for Illawarra in the Tarsha Gale Cup for Under 19s.
 In 2021, Tegan Dymock ( 1m) and Zali Hopkins  9m 2t) played for Cronulla in the Tarsha Gale Cup for Under 19s.
 In 2021, Fatafehi Hanisi played for St George ( 11m 2t) in the Tarsha Gale Cup for Under 19s. She was contracted for the Parramatta Eels in the postponed 2021 NRLW season, but did not play. She was signed for the 2022 season but a season-long leg injury curtailed her involvement.
 In 2022, Monalisa Soliola (Canterbury ( 6m 4t 5g) played in the Tarsha Gale Cup for Under 19s and represented New South Wales Under 19 women against Queensland on 23 June 2022. 
 In 2022, Andie Robinson represented New South Wales Under 19 women against Queensland on 23 June 2022, scoring a hattrick of tries in the match. Robinson had not appeared in the 2022 Tarsha Gale Cup competition.
 Salma Nour played for the Illawarra Steelers in the Tarsha Gale Cup in both the 2021 ( 9m 5t 1g) and 2022 ( 7m 10t) seasons. Nour was selected in the extended squad for New South Wales in the 2022 Under 19 State of Origin but was not included in the playing 17 for that match.

The St. George Illawarra Dragons announced player signings in several instalments between early June and late July 2022.

Sydney Roosters 

The team is coached by John Strange.  
Jersey numbers in the table reflect those assigned for the Semi-Finals. 
Table last updated on 29 Sep 2022 (after the Semi-Finals).

Notes: 
 Zahara Temara kicked a field goal in the Round 4 match of the 2021 NRLW season.
  In 2021, Keilee Joseph ( 8m 3t), Otesa Pule ( 11m 10t) and Taneka Todhunter ( 11m 6t) played for the Indigenous Academy Sydney Roosters in the Tarsha Gale Cup for Under 19s.
 In 2022, Jada Taylor ( 6m 9t) and Otesa Pule ( 9m 13t) played for the Indigenous Academy Sydney Roosters in the Tarsha Gale Cup for Under 19s. Pule was the player of the match in the Tarsha Gale Cup Grand Final. Both played in the Under 19 State of Origin match, Pule for Queensland and Taylor, scoring two tries in a player of the match performance, for New South Wales.

The Sydney Roosters announced player signings in several instalments between early June and early July 2022.

Unsigned Players 
The following players from the 2021 NRLW season are currently unsigned. 
Each NRLW club is permitted to have 24 players in their roster. 
Based on announced signings as at 2 August 2022 the Newcastle Knights had one vacancy in their roster, whilst the other five clubs had filled all 24 places in their roster.

Notes:
 Cobie-Jane Morgan was selected in the 2015 New South Wales women's rugby league team.
 Kayla Romaniuk ( 6m) played for Newcastle in the 2021 Tarsha Gale Cup for Under 21s.
 Maddie Studdon kicked a field goal in the Round 1 match of the 2021 NRLW season.

Unavailable Players 
The following players were unavailable to play in the 2022 NRL Women's season, due to:
 an injury that requires a long-term recovery period.
 illness
 pregnancy

Notes: 
 Brydie Parker was selected in the extended squad of the New South Wales women's rugby league team in 2020 and 2021, but did not play in either match.
 Nakita Sao played for  Wests Panthers and later  North Sydney in the 2021 state competitions of, respectively, Queensland and New South Wales. 
 Nakita Sao also played for Wests Panthers ( 4m 1t) in the Queensland's Under 19 club matches in 2021.
 In 2021, Fatafehi Hanisi played for St George ( 11m 2t) in the Tarsha Gale Cup for Under 19s. She was contracted for the Parramatta Eels in the postponed 2021 NRLW season, but did not play. She was signed with the St George Illawarra Dragons for the 2022 season but a season-long leg injury curtailed her involvement.

See also

List of current NRL team squads
List of current NRL Women's coaches

References

External links

Squads
National Rugby League lists
NRL Women's team squads
NRL Women's